Walter Marcon (28 March 1824 – 14 November 1875) was an English cleric, noted as a cricketer who played six first-class matches for Oxford University in 1843 and 1844. He had previously established a reputation for extremely fast bowling at Eton College.

Schools cricket
Born at Swaffham, Norfolk, Marcon played for the Eton First XI in 1841 and 1842, alongside another fast bowler, Harvey Fellows. Marcon's pace was so fast that he warranted three long stops, despite the wicketkeeper standing well back.

In his book Cricket, W. G. Grace wrote that Marcon's deliveries would smash a stump if making a direct hit without bouncing first; he reported his father saying that he "could hardly trace the ball" when fielding at point. Marcon once bowled a ball that knocked the bat out of the batsman's hands and through the wicket.

First-class career
Surprisingly, given his reputation as a bowler, Marcon took no known wickets in his first-class career. Bowling analyses were rarely compiled at the time, and bowlers were not credited with wickets which fell to catches.

Marcon went up to Worcester College, Oxford, in 1842, and joined the University of Oxford team in 1843, making his debut against Marylebone Cricket Club (MCC) on 24 May at Bullingdon Green, near Oxford. Batting third, he scored 2 in the first innings and was run out for a duck in the second. That was his only match in 1843.

In 1844, he played against MCC at the Magdalen Ground on 30 May, scoring 15 and 5. He then played for the West of England at Lord's on 24 June, making no score in either innings. He scored another duck followed by his career best 29 playing for Oxford against MCC at Lord's on 27 June.

In the University Match against Cambridge at Lord's on 4 July, Marcon scored 24 and eight not out. His final match was for the West of England against MCC at Bath on 5 August, when he scored two and was not out without scoring in the second innings. His bowling analysis was recorded in this match: he took no wickets for eight runs from forty balls.

Later life
Marcon abandoned cricket after he left Oxford to become a vicar in Cornwall and eventually the Rector of Edgefield in his native Norfolk. He married Caroline Eliza Hayes Middleton in about 1847, and they had seven children. Walter Marcon died in Edgefield in 1875. The couple's eldest child, also called Walter, succeeded his father as Rector of Edgefield and served there from the 1870s to the 1930s.

References

External links
 
 Player Profile: Walter Marcon from CricketArchive

1824 births
1875 deaths
English cricketers
English cricketers of 1826 to 1863
Oxford University cricketers
People from Swaffham
West of England cricketers
People educated at Eton College
Alumni of Worcester College, Oxford
19th-century English Anglican priests
People from North Norfolk (district)